NYU Langone Hospital – Brooklyn is a full-service, 450-bed academic teaching hospital in the Sunset Park neighborhood of Brooklyn, New York City. Formerly named NYU Lutheran Medical Center, it functions as the hub of Lutheran Healthcare, which itself is part of the larger NYU Langone Health.

Many of Lutheran's staff members are bilingual/bicultural, speaking languages such as Spanish, Chinese, Arabic, and Russian, reflecting the diversity of Sunset Park. The hospital offers a range of clinical programs, including a New York State designated Stroke Center, Regional Trauma Center, interventional and therapeutic cardiac catheterization laboratory, orthopedics and a Bariatric Center of Excellence. It treated 75,808 patients in 2011, and has one of the busiest emergency departments in Brooklyn, treating approximately 80,000 patients a year.

History

Norwegian Lutheran Deaconess Hospital
Lutheran Medical Center was founded in 1883 by Sister Elisabeth Fedde, a Norwegian Lutheran deaconess nurse. By 1890 it had moved from its original William Street (in Red Hook)  to 4520 Fourth Avenue. Incremental expansion, beginning in the 1950s, increased the number of beds from under 200 (1967) to over 400
(2017). In 1974 the hospital moved to 150 55th Street in Sunset Park in a former factory building.

Expansion
In 2004 the newly added Chinese Unit's "16-bed wing on the fourth floor" was described by The New York Daily News as "the only one of its kind in Brooklyn catering specifically to the burgeoning Chinese immigrant population in Sunset Park." Translators are available 24/7. The hospital also provides Halal or kosher meals to those that request them.

A $2.5 million cardiac catheterization laboratory opened in 2005. The new lab allows technicians to produce cardiac angiograms, which are high-quality images of the heart and coronary arteries. This allows clots, blockages and other problems to be shown.

In 2010, the Emergency Department (ED) went through a major expansion, which increased its space and services by 45 percent. The ED expansion included the increase of treatment bays from 30 to 46 and an additional exam room creating a five-room Quick Care area for Lutheran's successful triage, treat and release program. The additional bays allow clinicians to treat sicker patients while the new Quick Care Program will provide treatment for less urgent conditions. The expansion also included discrete child-friendly pediatric treatment bays. An upgraded radiology suite located on site brings state-of-the-art technology right into the treatment area facilitating faster turn around time for patients and their families.

In popular culture
ABC News' documentary series NY Med featured Lutheran in several episodes. Lutheran is also featured on NY ER which airs on OWN Lutheran's busy Emergency Department and Trauma Center are what attracted producers to the southwest Brooklyn hospital. Dr. Charles Guidry and Dr. Tara Margarella were two Lutheran surgeons featured on the show.

Certifications

New York State Department of Health Designations
American College of Surgeons Level 1 Trauma Center 
Level 1 Adult Trauma Center
Level 2 Perinatal Center
Stroke Center
AIDS Center

Other Designations/Certifications
Joint Commission on Accreditation of Healthcare Organizations (JCAHO) - Comprehensive Stroke Center

References

External links
 

Hospitals in Brooklyn
Sunset Park, Brooklyn
Hospitals established in 1883
New York University
Trauma centers